The International Institute for Neurosciences of Natal - Edmond and Lily Safra (IINN-ELS - Portuguese for Instituto Internacional de Neurociências de Natal - Edmond e Lily Safra) is located in Natal, capital city of the Brazilian state of Rio Grande do Norte. It was projected and is directed by neuroscientist Miguel Nicolelis (considered one of the 20 most important neuroscientists in activity in the last decade). The IINN aims to decentralize research in Brazil, currently restricted to South and Southeast regions of Brazil.

There are many educational projects held by the IINN, to support the local community and teach science to children of the nearby area. Nicolelis said he chose that district to create the institute exactly because it was the worst in terms of education.
Some children said they have always hated science subjects such as Chemistry, but after learning with the IINN projects, now they dream of becoming scientists.

One of its objectives is to allow the return of Brazilian scientists to the country and create an enabling environment for foreigners to come based on criteria internally defined by the institution's managers. In addition to the Neuroscience Institute itself (represented by research laboratories), the IINN-ELS complex project includes a model school for the underprivileged communities of Natal and Macaíba, with a hospital focused on the local community. Despite having massive federal investments for the construction of physical facilities, IINN-ELS is an autonomous institution managed by the Alberto Santos Dumont Association for Research Support Association (AASDAP) responsible for raising funds for maintenance and costing of the Institute. IINN-ELS local coordination is from Dr. Nicolelis. In 2007, the IINN received a strong cash reinforcement: Education Minister Fernando Haddad signed a decree allocating R $42 million to the institution. in 2007, on the occasion of the II IINN Symposium, it was renamed the Edmond and Lily Safra International Christmas Neuroscience Institute through an agreement with the Safra Foundation. in September 2011 it was announced that the institute would be offering its own PhD program from 2012 in the areas of neuroscience, neurotechnology, neuroengineering and neuroeducation. However, by the end of 2016 such a program had not yet been instituted.

External links 
  Official website
  Official website

Research institutes in Brazil
Neuroscience research centers in Brazil
Natal, Rio Grande do Norte